Washington Etchamendi Sosa (2 March 1921 — 30 May 1976) was a Uruguayan football manager, who notably managed Nacional in 1971.

Career
Born in Soto, Paysandú Department, Etchamendi began his career with Club Canillitas, and later went on to manage Progreso, Defensor Sporting and Liverpool Montevideo before moving to Argentina in 1965. He also took over Colón (where he was manager for just a week), Unión de Santa Fe and Los Andes in that country before moving back to Uruguay.

In 1970, after an impressive year in charge of Bella Vista, Etchamendi was named Nacional manager. He led the latter club to three Primera División titles (1970, 1971, 1972), aside from winning the 1971 Copa Libertadores and the 1971 Intercontinental Cup.

After leaving Nacional at the end of the 1972 season, Etchamendi subsequently worked at the Paraguay national team, Montevideo Wanderers, Bella Vista, Club León and Deportivo Cali.

Death
On 30 May 1976, while managing Deportivo Cali, Etchamendi suffered a myocardial infarction during the second half of a home fixture against Independiente Santa Fe. Despite being aided by nearby people, he was declared dead 30 minutes after the incident.

Honours
Nacional
Uruguayan Primera División: 1970, 1971, 1972
Copa Libertadores: 1971
Intercontinental Cup: 1971

References

External links

AUF profile 

1921 births
1976 deaths
People from Paysandú
Uruguayan football managers
Defensor Sporting managers
Liverpool F.C. (Montevideo) managers
C.A. Cerro managers
C.A. Bella Vista managers
Club Nacional de Football managers
Montevideo Wanderers managers
Club Atlético Colón managers
Unión de Santa Fe managers
Club Atlético Los Andes managers
Paraguay national football team managers
Deportivo Cali managers
Uruguayan expatriate football managers
Uruguayan expatriate sportspeople in Argentina
Uruguayan expatriate sportspeople in Paraguay
Uruguayan expatriate sportspeople in Mexico
Uruguayan expatriate sportspeople in Colombia
Expatriate football managers in Argentina
Expatriate football managers in Paraguay
Expatriate football managers in Mexico
Expatriate football managers in Colombia